The Eternal Road is a 2017 drama film, based on a novel by Antti Tuuri, who also co-wrote the screenplay. The film was directed by Antti-Jussi Annila and stars Tommi Korpela, Sidse Babett Knudsen, Hannu-Pekka Björkman, Irina Björklund and Ville Virtanen.

The film was edited and shot in Estonia in lieu of locations in Karelia. This was also the last film Lembit Ulfsak acted in before his death on 22 March 2017.

Plot
Jussi Ketola, a Finnish man, returns from America trying to escape from the Great Depression. He finds his country in great political turmoil. One night, Ketola is abducted from his home by nationalists and is forced to walk the Eternal Road towards Soviet Russia.

Cast
 Tommi Korpela as Jussi Ketola
 Sidse Babett Knudsen as Sara Ketola
 Hannu-Pekka Björkman as Kallonen
 Irina Björklund as Sofia
 Ville Virtanen as John Hill
 Helen Söderqvist as Martta Hill
 Lembit Ulfsak as Novikov

Reception
Jessica Kiang from Variety gave the film a bad review and writing: "It's hard to warm to Ketola as the kind of hero who could warrant such epic storytelling. Much is made, at the outset, of his overweening desire to get back to his Finnish family. But then he has his candles lit by Sara, and suddenly they're in church baptizing their newborn (the religiosity of the inhabitants, in vehemently secular communist Russia, is another tantalizing avenue barely explored). And a title tells us this is only 1932, and so Ketola appears to have pined for his Finnish wife and kids for mere months, before establishing a new family on the farm."

The film was nominated in 13 categories at the 2018 Jussi Awards, including Best Picture, Best Director (for Annila), Best Supporting Actress (for Sidse Babett Knudsen), Best Screenplay (for Annila, Louhimies and Tuuri), Best Actor (for Tommi Korpela) and Best Supporting Actor (for Hannu-Pekka Björkman).

Accolades
The Eternal Road garnered thirteen nominations, which was the greatest amount for that year at Jussi Awards. Kalju Kivi is the first Estonian in the Jussi Awards history to have won.

See also 
 The Forsaken: An American Tragedy in Stalin's Russia
 Foreign workers in the Soviet Union

References

External links 

2010s historical drama films
Films based on Finnish novels
Films shot in Estonia
Films about the Soviet Union in the Stalin era
Films about Soviet repression
Estonian drama films
Finnish historical drama films
Swedish historical drama films
2017 drama films
Films scored by Panu Aaltio
Films scored by Tuomas Kantelinen
2010s Swedish films